The Mood were a British pop band from 1981 to 1984, based in York, England. It consisted of members John Moore, Mark James and Eric James (the latter no relation, as their real names were Mark James Fordyce and Eric James Logan).

Career
They released a single on a local small independent record label, Romantic Records, entitled "Is There A Reason". In 1981 they were a five-piece band, and with Moore and the two James were Steve Carter and John Dalby. After the band reshuffle, the three remaining members of The Mood signed to RCA Records in 1981, and released a new re-produced mix of "Is There A Reason". Then came "Don't Stop", a No. 1 on the first UK Dance Chart. Neither track reached the Top 40 in the UK Singles Chart, and the follow-up "Paris is One Day Away" stalled at No. 42. Two places higher might have got them a slot on BBC Television's music programme, Top of the Pops. However, they did appear on the popular children's programme, Razzmatazz performing "Don't Stop".

Follow up singles were "Passion in Dark Rooms" with "The Munich Thing" on the b-side, and a final single, "I Don't Need Your Love Now". The band split up in 1984. A mini-LP was released in the US, although no album was released in the UK.

John Moore reformed The Mood (without Mark or Eric) briefly in 1992, with Paul Atkinson (bass) and Steve Bradley (drums). The band gigged regularly in the north of England – playing mostly new, rock based material – before changing their name to Wild, and subsequently splitting up in late 1993.

All The Mood singles were released on a nineteen track album by Cherry Red Records (licensed from Sony/BMG) on 21 July 2008, titled The Singles Collection, which included all the singles and b-sides, plus the additional tracks from their US album.

Present day
Eric James (Logan) is currently a teacher at St Albans School, and also pursues a career as a visual artist. He maintains an official site. Mark James (Fordyce) is currently the managing director of Sugarstar, a website that provides "pre-cleared" music for use in television, commercials and films; and chairman/founder of York Data Services, a business internet service provider in North Yorkshire and John Moore (the lead singer, guitarist and sole writer of all Mood songs) is still residing in York.

Discography

Singles
 "Is There a Reason" (1981)
 "Is There a Reason" (Re-Recording) (1981)
 "Don't Stop" (1982) – UK No. 59
 "Paris Is One Day Away" (1982) – UK No. 42
 "Passion in Dark Rooms" / "The Munich Thing" (1983) – UK No. 74
 "I Don't Need Your Love Now" (1984)

Albums
Passion in Dark Rooms (1983) (US only release)
The Singles Collection (2008)

References

External links
Themood.info, containing information and rare pictures

English pop music groups
English new wave musical groups
Musical groups established in 1981
Musical groups disestablished in 1984